The 1927–28 season was the 16th season of competitive soccer under the United States Soccer Federation.

National team

Men's 

Matches played between July 1927 and June 1928.

League tables

ASL 

First halfSecond half

St. Louis Soccer League

National Challenge Cup

1927 tournament

1928 tournament

ASL League Cup

References 

 
Seasons in American soccer